Andrey Ricardo Nunes de Almeida Alves (born 10 April 1988 in Londrina) is a Brazilian footballer who currently plays for Sport Huancayo of the Torneo Descentralizado in Peru.

He played for São Paulo in Brazil before moving abroad. He joined South African Premier Soccer League club Wits University F.C. in 2008, but was released before he played in an official match for the club.

References

External links
Guardian's Stats Centre

1988 births
Living people
Brazilian footballers
Brazilian expatriate footballers
Expatriate footballers in Finland
FC Inter Turku players
Veikkausliiga players
Expatriate footballers in Peru
Sport Huancayo footballers
Peruvian Primera División players
Association football forwards
Sportspeople from Londrina
21st-century Brazilian people